The ninth season of the Dutch reality singing competition The Voice of Holland premiered on 2 November 2018 on RTL4. Hosts Martijn Krabbé, Wendy van Dijk, and Jamai Loman as well as three season 8 coaches, Waylon, and Ali B and Anouk all returned, while  Sanne Hans was replaced with Lil Kleine.

Dennis Van Aarssen won the competition from team Waylon and Waylon became the winning mentor for the second time.

Coaches and hosts 

During the Grand Finale of season 8 broadcast on February 16, 2018, it was announced that Sanne Hans would not be returning to the show for the ninth season and would be replaced by rapper Lil Kleine. Waylon, Ali B and Anouk returned as coaches while Martijn Krabbé, Wendy van Dijk, and Jamai Loman all returned as hosts.

Teams 
Color key

Blind auditions 

 Color key

Episode 1 (November 2)

Episode 2 (November 9)

Episode 3 (November 16)

Episode 4 (November 23)

Episode 5 (November 30)

Episode 6 (December 7)

Episode 7 (December 14)

The Battle Rounds

The non-stop steal is implemented again in this season. For this round, Anouk, Ali B, and Lil' Kleine switched chair positions to Lil' Kleine, Anouk, and Ali B, respectively.

Color key:

The Knockouts

Color key
 – Contestant was eliminated, either immediately (indicated by a "—" in the "Switched with" column) or switched with another contestant
 – Contestant was not switched out and advanced to the Live Shows

The Live Shows

Color key
 – Artist had one of the six lowest scores and was eliminated
 – Artist's score was among the top six, advancing them to the next Live round
 – Artist was voted through by the public vote after having one of the lowest scores

Week 1: Top 12 (February 1)

Week 2: Top 9 (February 8)

Week 3: Semi-Final - Top 6 (February 15)

Just like previous seasons, this week, after all six artists have performed their first songs, one was eliminated based on the ongoing public vote. A second artist was then eliminated after the top 5's second performances regardless of their teams, leaving four artists advanced to the finale. With the elimination of Quido, Lil Kleine had no more acts left on his team to compete.

Week 4: Final (February 22)

Elimination Chart

Overall
Color key
Artist's info

Result details

Team
Color key
Artist's info

Result details

Artists' appearances in other media
 Chevelly Cooman auditioned for The voice of Holland season 8, but no chairs turned.
 Sanne Veltman participated in the sixth season of The Voice Kids. She made it until the Sing-Off round.
 Quido van de Graaf was a contestant of Bloed, Zweet en Tranen.
 Sascha van den Kerckhove was a contestant of Dutch Idols season 5.
 Amy Mielatz was a contestant of Dutch Idols season 6.
 Kimberly Fransens auditioned for The voice of Holland season 2. She became a member of team Angela Groothuizen and she was eliminated in The Battle Rounds. She also participated in the fifth season of Dutch Idols and she finished runner-up.
 Nathalie Blue auditioned for the eighth season of Holland's Got Talent.
 Billy Maluw participated in The voice of Holland season 1. He became a member of team Nick & Simon and he was eliminated in The Battle Rounds.
 Niels Hereijgers auditioned for The voice of Holland season 8, but no chairs turned.
 Bryan B auditioned for The voice of Holland season 2, but no chairs turned. He also participated in Dutch TV series 'The Winner Is' and he won the show.
 Jamal Bijnoe, part of Olorun, placed third in Dutch X Factor season 2.
 Raffie van Maren auditioned for the first season of  The Voice Kids, but no chairs turned.
 Luigiano Paals was a contestant in Dutch X Factor season 2 and British X Factor season 8.
 Irene Dings participated in the second season of  The Voice Kids as part of team Nick & Simon and finished runner-up.
 Nate James participated in The Voice UK season 2, where he became part of team Jessie J. He was eliminated during The Battle Rounds.
 Mentissa Aziza was announced the winner of Belgian Flemish version of The Voice Kids season one.
 Mannus ter Avest participated twice in The Voice Kids: in the first season in 2012 and in the fifth season in 2015. In both seasons, he was eliminated during The Battle Rounds.
 Wytse Visser participated in De beste singer-songwriter van Nederland season 3. He also participated in Belgian TV programme The Band, where he reached the final round.

Ratings

References

The Voice of Holland
2018 Dutch television seasons
2018 in music